Molecular Cell is a peer-reviewed scientific journal that covers research on cell biology at the molecular level, with an emphasis on new mechanistic insights. It was established in 1997 and is published two times per month. Its 2021 impact factor is 19.328. Molecular Cell is a Cell Press journal (an imprint of Elsevier) and is a companion to Cell.

Launched in December 1997, Molecular Cell publishes a relatively small number of papers, up to 15 articles per issue. Coverage includes structure to human diseases, concentrating on molecular analyses. Topics include gene expression, RNA processing, replication, recombination and repair, structure, chaperones, receptors, signal transduction, cell cycle, metabolism, and tumorigenesis.

The majority of papers published in Molecular Cell are articles in the format familiar from Cell. However, it also publishes short papers (up to 6 published pages) that make focused contributions on points of general interest.

External links 
 

Publications established in 1997
Molecular and cellular biology journals
Biweekly journals
English-language journals
Cell Press academic journals